Strong authentication is a notion with several definitions.

Strong (customer) authentication definitions 
Strong authentication is often confused with two-factor authentication (more generally known as multi-factor authentication), but strong authentication is not necessarily multi-factor authentication. Soliciting multiple answers to challenge questions may be considered strong authentication but, unless the process also retrieves 'something you have' or 'something you are', it would not be considered multi-factor authentication. The FFIEC issued supplemental guidance on this subject in August 2006, in which they clarified, "By definition true multifactor authentication requires the use of solutions from two or more of the three categories of factors. Using multiple solutions from the same category ... would not constitute multifactor authentication."

Another commonly found class of definitions relates to a cryptographic process, or more precisely, authentication based on a challenge–response protocol. This type of definition is found in the Handbook of applied cryptography.  This type of definition does not necessarily relate to two-factor authentication, since the secret key used in a challenge–response authentication scheme can be simply derived from a password (one factor).

A third class of definitions says that strong authentication is any form of authentication in which the verification is accomplished without the transmission of a password. This is the case for example with the definition found in the Fermilab documentation.

The fourth class, which has legal standing within the European Economic Area, is Strong Customer Authentication.

The Fast IDentity Online (FIDO) Alliance has been striving to establish technical specifications for strong authentication and has 250 members and over 150 certified products. 

Thus, the term strong authentication can be used as long as the notion strong is defined in the context of use.

See also 
 3-D Secure
 Electronic authentication
EMV
 FIDO Alliance
 Initiative for Open Authentication
 Reliance authentication
 Self-sovereign identity

References 

Computer access control
Authentication methods